The Military Virtue Medal is a Romanian military decoration, instituted on April 8, 1872, by King Carol I. A previous version, called Pro Virtute Militari, was established by Alexandru Ioan Cuza in 1860 for the veterans of the Dealul Spirii battle (1848) between the revolutionaries and the Ottomans, but it was issued to the recipients later, in 1866, due to political reasons (Romania was still under Ottoman suzerainty).

The medal had 2 classes, the 1st class (in gold) being awarded to the officers, and the 2nd class (in silver) to non-commissioned officers and the other enlisted ranks. After the Order of Michael the Brave was instituted (1916), the Military Virtue Medal was issued only to the NCO's and soldiers.

Data
Requirements: Awarded to NCOs and other enlisted ranks for exceptional deeds on the battlefield
Classes: 2nd and 1st
Date Instituted: April 1872

War Medal of Military Virtue

In 1880 Carol I of Romania, the first ruler of the Hohenzollern-Sigmaringen dynasty, instituted a new Medal of Military Virtue. This one was given for bravery only during wartime. Soldiers who had earned the medal during wartime were able to trade in their old medal for a new wartime version, the War Medal of Military Virtue (Medalia Virtutea Militara de Razboi).

See also
List of military decorations
National Decorations System (Romania)
Military decoration

External links 
  Military Virtue Medal at worldwar2.ro
  History of the Medal at the Romanian Presidency site

Military awards and decorations of Romania